The following lists events that happened during 1824 in Chile.

Incumbents
Supreme Director of Chile: Ramón Freire

Events

April
1 April - Battle of Mocopulli

Births
date unknown - Francisco Bascuñán Guerrero (d. 1873)

Deaths
date unknown - Juan Crisóstomo Lafinur

References 

 
1820s in Chile
Chile
Chile